Amarveer Singh Dhesi (born September 2, 1995), commonly known as Amar Dhesi, is a Canadian freestyle wrestler, competing in the 125 kg weight class.

Career

Junior
In 2014, Dhesi won silver at the 2014 Junior World Championships in Zagreb, Croatia, which was later upgraded to gold, after the winner tested positive for doping.

After this tournament, Dhesi suffered three ACL tears in his knee in six years, limiting his ability to compete.

Senior
In December 2019, Dhesi won the Canadian trials, which allowed him to represent Canada at the 2020 Pan American Wrestling Olympic Qualification Tournament. In March 2020, he finished in the top two at the tournament, which officially qualified him for the 2020 Summer Olympics in Tokyo. Dhesi would also go onto win the Matteo Pellicone Ranking Series 2021.

In May 2021, Dhesi was officially named to Canada's 2020 Olympic team. He competed in the men's 125 kg event at the 2020 Summer Olympics. Two months after the Olympics, he competed in the men's 125 kg event at the 2021 World Wrestling Championships held in Oslo, Norway.

At the 2022 Commonwealth Games, Dhesi won the gold medal in the 125 kg event. He competed in the 125kg event at the 2022 World Wrestling Championships held in Belgrade, Serbia.

References

External links
 
 
 
 

1995 births
Living people
Canadian male sport wrestlers
Olympic wrestlers of Canada
Wrestlers at the 2020 Summer Olympics
Commonwealth Games gold medallists for Canada
Commonwealth Games medallists in wrestling
Wrestlers at the 2022 Commonwealth Games
Sportspeople from Surrey, British Columbia
Canadian sportspeople of Indian descent
20th-century Canadian people
21st-century Canadian people
Medallists at the 2022 Commonwealth Games